The 1981 Avon Championships were the tenth WTA Tour Championships, the annual tennis tournament for the best female tennis players in singles on the 1981 WTA Tour. It was held in the week of 22 March 1981, in Madison Square Garden in New York City, United States. First-seeded Martina Navratilova won the singles title and earned $100,000 first-prize money.

Champions

Singles

 Martina Navratilova defeated  Andrea Jaeger, 6–3, 7–6(7–3)

Doubles

 Martina Navratilova /  Pam Shriver defeated  Barbara Potter /  Sharon Walsh, 6–0, 7–6(8–6)

See also
 1981 Toyota Series Championships

References

External links
 
 ITF tournament edition details

WTA Tour Championships
Avon Championships
Avon Championships
Avon Championships
1980s in Manhattan
Avon Championships
Madison Square Garden
Sports competitions in New York City
Sports in Manhattan
Tennis tournaments in New York City